The Center for Arts in Natick, also known as TCAN (pronounced tee-can) in Natick, Massachusetts, is a regional community arts organization serving the cities and towns of MetroWest Boston. It has been in existence in various locations since 1997. The organization presents more than 300 events, classes and performances each year attended by over 28,000 patrons annually. TCAN was established as a 501(c)(3) nonprofit organization in 1997.

History 

In 1997, founding director Michael Moran envisioned a coffeehouse venue in Natick Center, serving as a center of cultural and social interaction and an informal club for artists and regular members. Leasing a small storefront at 31 Main Street in Natick Center with a seating capacity of 60 patrons, TCAN hosted frequent open mic programs for local songwriters, a weekly jazz jam, small community theatre productions and visual art exhibits by local artists. In time more programs were added including a regular all-ages rock concert featuring teen bands, a classical music series and family performances for young children. The organization relied extensively on volunteers to provide staffing for events and drive marketing/fundraising activities.

Relocation to Natick Central Fire Station 

The success of TCAN in its original location encouraged the organization to seek a larger and more permanent facility. After considering alternate locations, TCAN purchased the historic Central Fire Station from the Town of Natick in October 1998. Originally constructed in 1875 following a devastating fire in 1874, the Central Fire Station is located in the heart of Natick Center and is recognized in the National Register of Historic Places.
A $2.5M restoration of the building included installation of a steel beam to allow use of 4,000 sq. ft. for the main performance space, reconstruction of the historic cupola that sits atop the hose drying tower, restoration of windows and masonry, installation of a new roof, and the return of the modified two double-bay entrances to the original four arched bays, complete with opening wood doors. The new TCAN facility, with four times as much seating capacity (270 seats), was opened as a performing arts center in May 2003.

Management and Volunteers 

In March 2004, shortly after relocation to the larger venue, TCAN's Board of Directors hired David Lavalley as its new executive director. The decision to part ways with founding director Michael Moran was met with local controversy and the departure of some volunteers, who protested his termination.
TCAN is governed by an elected volunteer Board of Directors, run by a staff of full-time and part-time employees and supported by over 175 volunteers. TCAN relies on volunteers to produce events, staff its box office and support all facets of marketing, fundraising and operations.

Mission and Programs 

TCAN is unique in providing a wide variety of programming, ranging from nationally known touring musicians to local performers, theatre, comedy, arts education classes and family programs.

Featured Performances - Concerts feature well-known touring musicians and bands spanning folk, blues, contemporary, rock, jazz, fusion and classical music. See List of Notable Performances.

Art House Cinema - The TCAN Screening Room, a 120-seat digital cinema venue, was added in a 2016 renovation. Screenings of classic films and new releases are held weekly including feature films, documentaries and classic movies.

TCAN Players - TCAN is home to its own community theatre troupe, who present three productions each year. Auditions are open to the public. TCAN Players, including their productions, cast and crew have been nominated and received DASH awards by the Eastern Massachusetts Association of Community Theatres.

Folk Open Mic - An Open Mic event for singer-songwriters and musicians of all genres.

Young Masters Series - A classical music series dedicated to presenting talented young classical musicians from around the world.

Strategic Partnerships 

TCAN has initiated strategic partnerships to strengthen programming and expand its audience.

In 2008, TCAN and the Danforth Museum in Framingham, Massachusetts announced a strategic partnership to  enhance program offerings and benefits for members of their respective organizations.
In 2013, TCAN and the Walnut Hill School in Natick, Massachusetts announced a partnership to share resources, facilities and expertise to advance their respective missions, enhance the Natick Center Cultural District, while also creating long-term sustainability for each organization.
In partnership with Natick Service Council, South Middlesex Opportunities Council and United Way of TriCounty, TCAN offers a program called Smile in Every Seat that provides free access to TCAN's programming for economically disadvantaged people and families in Natick and surrounding communities.

Since 2012, TCAN has collaborated with The Verve Boston Natick, a hotel in the Tapestry Collection by Hilton Worldwide, to produce live music events in their Route 9 Natick location. These concerts have presented artists including Eddie Money, Loverboy, 10,000 Maniacs, The Smithereens, Lisa Marie Presley, Vertical Horizon, The Tubes and other national touring artists.

In 2021, TCAN presented its first outdoor live music event in a partnership with Belkin Family Lookout Farm in South Natick, featuring the group Carbon Leaf from Richmond, VA.

List of Notable Performances 

TCAN has featured thousands of performances on its stage, below is a partial list of artists who have performed at TCAN representing a variety of genres.

Artists inducted to the Rock and Roll Hall of Fame are recognized with an asterisk (*).

ALTERNATIVE
 Adrian Belew of King Crimson*
 Carbon Leaf
 Cowboy Junkies
 Ed Kowalczyk of Live (band)
 Robyn Hitchcock
 The Smithereens
 The Verve Pipe
BLUES
 Bettye LaVette
 Chris Smither
 Duke Robillard
 Gary Hoey
 James Cotton
 James Montgomery
 Jeff Daniels
 Jimmie Vaughan
 John P. Hammond
 Johnny A
 Leon Redbone
 Matt Schofield
 Robben Ford
 Ronnie Earl
 Rory Block
 The Blind Boys of Alabama
CLASSICAL
 Borromeo String Quartet
 Matt Haimovitz
 Matthew Aucoin
 Nathan Lee
 Paul Byrom
 Turtle Island String Quartet
COMEDY
 Brad Sherwood
 Colin Mochrie
 Jimmy Tingle
 Lenny Clarke
 Paula Poundstone
 Robert Klein
 Sandra Bernhard
 Steve Sweeney
 The Second City
COUNTRY
 Asleep at the Wheel
 Edwin McCain
 Gibson Brothers
 Iris Dement

 Kathy Mattea
 Lori McKenna
 Pure Prairie League
 Sam Bush
 Shelby Lynne
 Sierra Hull
 Suzy Bogguss
 Taylor Hicks
FOLK
 Cheryl Wheeler
 Darlingside
 Eddie from Ohio
 Eileen Ivers
 John Gorka
 Leo Kottke
 Peter Yarrow
 Richie Havens
 The Kingston Trio
 Tom Paxton
 Tom Rush
JAZZ
 Al Di Meola
 Billy Cobham
 California Guitar Trio
 David Cullen
 David Sanborn
 Deborah Henson-Conant
 George Winston
 Grace Kelly
 Jake Shimabukuro
 Jane Monheit
 Jimmy Herring
 Joe Robinson
 Keiko Matsui
 Kenny Rankin
 Larry Carlton
 Michael Manring
 Ottmar Liebert
 Robin Spielberg
 Stanley Clarke
 Tom Scott
 Tommy Emmanuel
 Tony Levin
 Will Ackerman
POP
 Al Stewart
 Atlanta Rhythm Section
 Aztec Two-Step

 Ben Taylor
 Chad & Jeremy
 Christopher Cross
 Colin Hay of Men at Work
 Crystal Bowersox
 Howie Day
 Joan Osborne
 Kenny White
 Landau Eugene Murphy, Jr.
 Lisa Marie Presley
 Marc Cohn
 Melanie Safka
 Paula Cole
 Renaissance
 Richard Marx
 Rickie Lee Jones
 Rockapella
 Stephen Bishop
 Susanna Hoffs
 The Left Banke
 The Proclaimers
 Thomas Dolby
 Vanessa Carlton
ROCK
 Ambrosia
 The Bottle Rockets
 Brad Delp of Boston (band)*
 Charlie Farren
 Clem Burke of Blondie*
 Dan Hicks
 Danny Seraphine of Chicago*
 Dave Davies of The Kinks*
 Dave Mason of Traffic (band)*
 Elliot Easton of The Cars*
 The Empty Hearts
 English Beat
 Enter the Haggis
 Eric Johnson (guitarist)
 The Fixx
 Felix Cavaliere of The Rascals*
 G. E. Smith of Saturday Night Live Band
 Gaelic Storm
 Graham Parker of The Rumour
 Greg Hawkes of The Cars*
 Jefferson Starship*
 Jeff Baxter of Steely Dan*
 Jim Messina of Loggins and Messina
 Jimmy Herring
 Jon Butcher

 Jordan Rudess of Dream Theater
 Lez Zeppelin
 Mark Farner of Grand Funk
 Marshall Crenshaw
 Martin Barre of Jethro Tull*
 Micky Dolenz of The Monkees
 The Motels
 Paul Kantner of Jefferson Airplane*
 Peter Tork of The Monkees
 Peter Wolf of The J. Geils Band
 Pousette-Dart Band
 Richie Furay of Buffalo Springfield*
 Roger McGuinn of The Byrds*
 Ronnie Spector of The Ronettes*
 Stick Men (prog band)
 Southside Johnny
 Tony Levin of King Crimson*
 Vanilla Fudge
 The Waifs
 Wishbone Ash
SINGER-SONGWRITER
 Anaïs Mitchell
 Antje Duvekot
 Catie Curtis
 Dar Williams
 Don McLean
 Ellis Paul
 J.D. Souther
 Jimmy Webb
 John Sebastian of Lovin Spoonful*
 Jonatha Brooke
 Jonathan Edwards
 Judy Collins
 Karla Bonoff
 Kate Taylor
 Livingston Taylor
 Loudon Wainwright III
 Lucy Kaplansky
 Martin Sexton
 Meg Hutchinson
 Patty Griffin
 Patty Larkin
 Richard Thompson
 Robyn Hitchcock
 Ruthie Foster
 Shawn Colvin
 Steve Forbert
 Susan Werner
 Suzanne Vega
 Todd Snider

Awards and Grants 

TCAN has been recognized with a number of grants and awards, including the following:

 2005 - Massachusetts Historical Commission - Preservation Award for Adaptive Reuse
 2005 - Natick Cultural Council - Certificate of Achievement
 2006 - Natick Historical Commission - 2006 Preservation Award
 2011 - Massachusetts General Court - Certificate of Recognition, Classical Music Series
 2014 - Massachusetts Cultural Council - Cultural Facility Fund Grant
 2016 - Natick Education Foundation - Shining Light Award, Community Business
 2020 - MetroWest Daily News - Best Place To See a Concert
 2020 - MetroWest Daily News - Best Live Theater
 2021 - MetroWest Daily News - Best Live Theater (finalist)
 2021 - MetroWest Daily News - Best Place To See a Concert (finalist)
 2022 - MetroWest Daily News - Best Live Music/Concert Venue
 2022 - MetroWest Daily News - Best Nonprofit/Charity Organization
 2022 - MetroWest Daily News - Best Live Theater (finalist)
 2022 - MetroWest Daily News - Best Tourist/Seasonal Attraction - Local (finalist)

In 2009 CNNMoney.com named Natick, Massachusetts #8 in its list of Best Places for a Healthy Retirement, citing The Center for Arts in Natick and Natick Mall as key amenities.

Natick Center in Natick, Massachusetts was awarded the designation of Cultural District by the Commonwealth of Massachusetts in 2012. TCAN and the Morse Institute Library were recognized as the cultural anchors of the District.

Other Facts of Interest 

The hose drying tower of the firehouse was originally used to hang canvas fire hoses after use, slowing the deterioration caused if the hoses were not dried thoroughly. The tower is now topped by a replica of the original cupola, designed and constructed in 2006 entirely by a group of volunteers led by Ken Soderholm and Jay Ball. The cupola was built from materials donated by local businesses.

Several performing artists have released recordings of live performances at TCAN. These include the following recordings:

 2006 Jonathan Edwards Live in Massachusetts
 2007 Aztec Two-Step Live at TCAN 35th Anniversary Concert DVD
 2011 Susan Werner Live: The Center for Arts in Natick
 2013 Ronnie Earl Just For Today

Scenes included in the 2013 American drama film Labor Day (film) starring Kate Winslet, Josh Brolin and Tobey Maguire were filmed in The Center for Arts in Natick.

References

External links 
 The Center for Arts in Natick website
 TCAN Players Community Theatre website
 TCAN volunteers construct a cupola - YouTube

Music venues in Massachusetts
Performing arts centers in Massachusetts
Folk music venues
Rock music venues
Event venues established in 1997